Heenatigala  is a village in Galle District in Sri Lanka, located  south-west of Galle and  west of Unawatuna.

Heenatigala is located between the A17 highway and A2.

See also
List of towns in Southern Province, Sri Lanka

References

Populated places in Southern Province, Sri Lanka
Populated places in Galle District